Kozlovka may refer to the following places in Russia:

 Kozlovka, Amur Oblast
 Kozlovka, Belgorod Oblast
 Kozlovka, Pochepsky District, Bryansk Oblast
 Kozlovka, Kozlovsky District, Chuvash Republic
 Kozlovka, Vladimir Oblast
 Kozlovka, Nikolsky District, Vologda Oblast
 Kozlovka, Totemsky District, Vologda Oblast
 Kozlovka, Volgograd Oblast

See also
Kozlov (disambiguation)
Kozlovsky (surname), a surname